Eastern Karbi Anglong College, established in 1997, is a major and general degree college situated in Sarihajan, Karbi Anglong district, Assam. This college is affiliated with the Assam University.

Departments

Arts
Assamese
Education 
English
History
Economics
Political Science
Sociology

References

External links
https://www.ekac.in/

Universities and colleges in Assam
Colleges affiliated to Assam University
Educational institutions established in 1997
1997 establishments in Assam